Maximiliano "Maxi" Rubén Rodríguez (born 2 January 1981) is an Argentine former footballer. Nicknamed La Fiera (The Beast in English), he was commonly used as a winger on both flanks but could also operate as an attacking midfielder.

Rodríguez arrived in Spain in his early 20s, and went on to spend the bulk of his professional career there, playing for Espanyol and Atlético Madrid and amassing La Liga totals of 232 matches and 58 goals over eight seasons. He also spent two years with Liverpool in England, and began and ended his career at Newell's Old Boys.

An Argentine international for 11 years, Rodríguez represented the country in three World Cups, finishing second in 2014.

Club career

Newell's and Espanyol
Born in Rosario, Santa Fe, Rodríguez came through the youth set-up at Newell's Old Boys in the Primera División. He played with the club for three seasons, before moving to Spain.

In 2002, Rodríguez moved to La Liga to join RCD Espanyol, his league debut coming on 2 September in a 0–2 loss against Real Madrid. He played 37 matches in every campaign with the Catalans, scoring 15 goals during his last.

Atlético Madrid
At the start of the 2005–06 season, Rodríguez moved to Atlético Madrid for a transfer fee of €5 million, where he continued to post consistent numbers. In his second year he suffered, alongside teammate (and winger) Martin Petrov, a serious knee injury (anterior cruciate ligament), which limited him to only ten appearances.

On 10 November 2009, Rodríguez put four goals past UD Marbella in the Copa del Rey round-of-32 second leg, in an eventual 6–0 home win (8–0 aggregate). After the 2007 departure of Fernando Torres to Liverpool, he was selected as the new club captain; he took no part in the Colchoneros 2009–10 UEFA Europa League campaign, which ended in conquest.

Liverpool

On 13 January 2010, Rodríguez completed a free transfer to Liverpool, signing a three-and-a-half-year deal; after securing his signature, Rafael Benítez described him as "comfortable on the ball, can pass and keep possession. He is good at getting into the box and scoring goals and a good finisher", and the player was given the number 17 shirt, making his debut for the club as a second-half substitute in a Premier League match against Stoke City on the 16th. His first full start came a week and a half later, in a 0–0 away draw to Wolverhampton Wanderers.

Rodríguez picked up two league assists in his first games, both of which were for former Atlético teammate Torres. He scored his first competitive goal in a 4–0 win over Burnley at Turf Moor on 25 April 2010, playing the full 90 minutes.

2010–11 was a good individual season for Rodríguez, who netted ten league goals for the team, including hat-tricks against Birmingham City (5–0 home victory) and Fulham (5–2 at Craven Cottage). In the latter match, he scored twice in the opening seven minutes – the first being just after 32 seconds – and completed his exhibition with a 25-yard strike.

On 8 July 2011, Rodríguez switched his jersey number to 11, and he scored two goals in a pre-season friendly with Malaysia shortly after, which finished with a 6–3 win. On 24 August, he was given his first start of the season in a League Cup tie against Exeter City, and netted the second in an eventual 3–1 away victory.

On 20 November 2011, Rodríguez scored against Chelsea following a build-up with teammate Craig Bellamy, with Liverpool winning it 2–1 at Stamford Bridge. Nine days later, against the same opponent, in the same venue and again with the decisive pass being made by the Welshman, he found the net in a 2–0 League Cup win, and his team went on to win the latter competition.

On 26 December 2011, Rodríguez scored just his second league goal of the season in a 1–1 draw at Anfield against Blackburn Rovers. He netted his last two on 10 April 2012, for a 3–2 away defeat of the same adversary.

Return to South America
On 13 July 2012, after 73 official games and 17 goals scored, Rodríguez left Liverpool and returned to his first professional club Newell's Old Boys. He wrote an open letter to the Reds fans before his departure, thanking them for their support in his two-and-a-half-year stint.

Rodríguez played his first match for the club since leaving on 5 August 2012, in a 0–0 draw against Club Atlético Independiente. According to him, football in his country was now "worse than ten years ago". In June 2013, he helped the team win the Torneo Final, being awarded the Alumni by directors and former directors of Argentinian football late in the year.

In July 2017, the 36-year-old Rodríguez moved to Uruguayan club Peñarol. After winning the league in both of his seasons in Montevideo, he returned to Newell's on an 18-month contract in the last days of 2018.

On 27 November 2021, Rodríguez confirmed his retirement at the age of 40, having been substituted to a standing ovation at home to Club Atlético Banfield in his final match. The following January, however, he joined Hughes Foot Ball Club in the Liga Venadense de Fútbol (a regional football league in Santa Fe Province) along with his childhood friend and Newell's teammate Ignacio Scocco, president of said club.

International career
Rodríguez won the 2001 FIFA World Youth Championship with the Argentine under-20s on home soil, scoring four goals in seven matches including the first and last for the eventual winners. He made his full side debut in a friendly match against Japan on 8 June 2003, in which he also found the net.

After being part of the 2005 FIFA Confederations Cup squad, Rodríguez was called for the 2006 FIFA World Cup by national boss José Pékerman and, on 16 June, he scored twice in Argentina's 6–0 victory over Serbia and Montenegro in the group stage. In the round of 16, he scored the winning goal against Mexico in a 2–1 extra time victory: he controlled a cross-field pass from Juan Pablo Sorín with his chest before volleying it into the top corner of Oswaldo Sánchez's net from outside the penalty area with his left foot, in the 98th minute; in an unofficial online poll by FIFA, it was voted the best goal of the tournament.

After Argentina lost the quarter-final game against Germany on 30 June 2006, Rodríguez punched opponent Bastian Schweinsteiger in the back. FIFA fined him CHF5,000 and suspended him from two matches in the 2007 Copa América for violent conduct. However, after a serious knee injury in a friendly with Spain in October 2006, he missed the continental competition as national team manager Alfio Basile, whom initially intended to select the player, eventually rested him for precaution.

Rodríguez scored in Diego Maradona's first game in charge of Argentina, a 1–0 friendly win in Scotland. On 19 May 2010 he was named in the squad of 23 for the 2010 World Cup in South Africa and, in the last home game before the finals five days later, scored twice against Canada, netting from a free kick from a sharp angle and after receiving a pass from Carlos Tevez in an eventual 5–0 rout.

In June 2014, Rodríguez made Argentina's list for the 2014 World Cup. He started in his side's opening game, a 2–1 defeat of Bosnia and Herzegovina at the Estádio do Maracanã, playing the first half before being substituted for Gonzalo Higuaín at half-time. He was only fielded again in the semi-finals against the Netherlands, converting the decisive penalty shootout attempt (0–0 after 120 minutes) to send his country to the final for the first time in 24 years.

Personal life
Rodríguez is the cousin of fellow footballers Alexis Rodríguez and Denis Rodríguez. All three played for Newell's at the same time.

Other ventures
In 2009, Rodríguez appeared in a music video for Coti, starring alongside Atlético teammate Diego Forlán.

Career statistics
Club

International
Appearances and goals by years:

Argentina score listed first, score column indicates score after each Rodríguez goal. Sign ‡ indicates goals scored from a penalty kick.

HonoursLiverpoolFootball League Cup: 2011–12
FA Cup runner-up: 2011–12Newell's Old BoysArgentine Primera División: 2013 FinalPeñarolUruguayan Primera División: 2017, 2018
Supercopa Uruguaya: 2018Argentina U20FIFA U-20 World Cup: 2001ArgentinaFIFA World Cup runner-up: 2014
FIFA Confederations Cup runner-up: 2005Individual'
Copa del Rey top scorer: 2009–10
Footballer of the Year of Argentina: 2013
Argentine Primera División top scorer: 2014

References

External links

Liverpool historic profile

1981 births
Living people
Argentine people of Spanish descent
Argentine footballers
Footballers from Rosario, Santa Fe
Association football midfielders
Association football wingers
Argentine Primera División players
Newell's Old Boys footballers
La Liga players
RCD Espanyol footballers
Atlético Madrid footballers
Premier League players
Liverpool F.C. players
Uruguayan Primera División players
Peñarol players
Argentina youth international footballers
Argentina under-20 international footballers
Argentina international footballers
2005 FIFA Confederations Cup players
2006 FIFA World Cup players
2010 FIFA World Cup players
2014 FIFA World Cup players
Argentine expatriate footballers
Expatriate footballers in Spain
Expatriate footballers in England
Expatriate footballers in Uruguay
Argentine expatriate sportspeople in Spain
Argentine expatriate sportspeople in England
Argentine expatriate sportspeople in Uruguay